This is a list of places on the Victorian Heritage Register in the City of Maribyrnong in Victoria, Australia. The Victorian Heritage Register is maintained by the Heritage Council of Victoria.

The Victorian Heritage Register, as of 2020, lists the following 22 state-registered places within the City of Maribyrnong:

References

Maribyrnong
City of Maribyrnong